Delvauxite, also known as borickite, is a yellow to brown to dark brown amorphous mineral, sometimes forming a botryoidal mass.

It was first described in 1838 by Belgian chemist, Dumont and dedicate to J.S.P.J. Delvaux de Fenffe (1782–1863). It was found in Bernau, Liege, Belgium and Stredocesky, Czech Republic.

References

Calcium minerals
Iron minerals
Phosphate minerals